Grace Leboy Kahn (September 22, 1890 - May 24, 1983) was an American composer.

Born in Brooklyn NY, Leboy was a precocious musician, gaining employment as a pianist by age 15, and fame by age 18 with her song "I Wish I Had A Girl". By age 21 she had songs on the Broadway stage in Jumping Jupiter. Notable performers of her day recorded her songs and compositions. Lyrics for many of her songs were written by Gus Kahn whom she married in 1916.  They were the parents of Donald Gustave Kahn (July 17, 1918 – April 11, 2008) and Irene Kahn (1922–1985). Grace was played by Doris Day in I'll See You in My Dreams, a film that portrays the lives and times of Leboy and Kahn.

Selected compositions

Are You Lonesome 1909
Bring Along Your Dancing Shoes 1915
Dublin Bay 1912
Early In The Morning (Down On The Farm) 1916
Everybody Rag With Me 1914
The Good Ship Mary Ann 1914
Henry, oh Henry 1912
I Wish I Had A Girl 1907
I'm awfully afraid of girls 1910
I'm on the jury 1913
It all goes up in smoke 1910
It's touch when Izzy Rosenstein loves Genevieve Malone 1910 
June, July and August 1909
Just wond'ring : waltz song  1927
Lazy Day 1932
Love and Springtime 1914
Make a noise like a hoop and roll away
Moonlight on the Mississippi 1913
Music vot's music must come from Berlin
My heart keeps right on beating 1911
Oh how that woman could cook 1914
On the 5:15
Pass The Pickles: Tango 1913
Pretty soft for me 1909
Roses at Dawning 
Say boys! I've found a girl 1909
Soap-bubble Days 1910
Think Of Me (I'll Be Thinking Of You)
Those Olden Golden Days of Long Ago (lyrics by Daisy Sullivan) 1917
To The Strains Of That Wedding March 1910
'Twas Only A Summer Night's Dream = Solo Fué Un Sueño En Noche De Verano 1932
You and I Cupid 1910
(You're always sure of) My love for you 1930
Will you always call me honey 1908
Will You Be Sorry? 1928
What's the use of moonlight 1909
When Jack Came Sailing Home Again 1911

References

External links
 Grace Kahn at IMDb
 free score and parts of band arrangement Pass the Pickles

1890 births
1983 deaths
20th-century American composers
Songwriters from New York (state)
Musicians from Brooklyn